The 2013 European Judo Championships were held in Budapest, Hungary from 25 to 28 April 2013.

Medal overview

Men

Women

Medal table

Results overview

Men

–60 kg

–66 kg

–73 kg

–81 kg

–90 kg

–100 kg

+100 kg

Teams

Women

–48 kg

–52 kg

–57 kg

–63 kg

–70 kg

–78 kg

+78 kg

Teams

References

External links
 Official website
 
 2013 EJC website
 Results
 Team results

 
Europe
European Judo Championships
Judo
European Judo Championships
International sports competitions in Budapest
Judo
European 2013
2010s in Budapest
International sports competitions hosted by Hungary
European Judo Championships